Abbasabad-e Kuchek (also Romanized as ‘Abbāsābād-e Kūchek) is a village in Saidabad Rural District, in the Central District of Savojbolagh County, Alborz Province, Iran. At the 2006 census, its population was 425, in 113 families.

References 

Populated places in Savojbolagh County